Peng Qiuping (born August 12, 1994) is a Chinese swimmer. She won a gold medal at the Mixed 4x50metre freestyle relay-20 Points event at the 2016 Summer Paralympics with a total team time of 2:18.03, a world record and paralympic record. She also won a gold medal at the Women's 50 metre Backstroke S3 event with a world record and paralympic record of 48.49 and a silver medal at the Women's 100m Freestyle S3 event with 1:34.71.

References

Living people
Swimmers at the 2016 Summer Paralympics
Medalists at the 2016 Summer Paralympics
Paralympic gold medalists for China
Paralympic silver medalists for China
Paralympic swimmers of China
S3-classified Paralympic swimmers
Chinese female backstroke swimmers
Chinese female freestyle swimmers
1994 births
Paralympic medalists in swimming
21st-century Chinese women
Medalists at the 2018 Asian Para Games